San Antonio Province is one of eight provinces of the central Chilean region of Valparaíso (V). Its capital is the port city of San Antonio (pop. 87,205).

Administration
As a province, San Antonio is a second-level administrative division, governed by a provincial delegate who is appointed by the president.

Communes
The province comprises six communes, each governed by a municipality consisting of an alcalde and municipal council:
Algarrobo
El Quisco
El Tabo
Cartagena
San Antonio (capital)
Santo Domingo

Geography and demography
According to the 2002 census, San Antonio Province had a population of 136,594, making it the fourth most populous province in the region. At that time, the population was 267,022 inhabitant with 125,637 people living in urban areas, 10,957 people living in rural areas, 67,771 men and 68,823 women.

San Antonio Valley wine region
San Antonio Valley is a small wine region known for producing Pinot Noir, Sauvignon Blanc and Chardonnay.
It is located very close to the sea around the city of San Antonio, Chile, south of the Casablanca Valley and only 55 miles (90 km) west of Santiago. As in other Chilean wine regions, like the Casablanca Valley, San Antonio is highly influenced by the cooling effect of the Pacific Ocean which makes wine production possible in this area.
Soils are in the valley are granitic, poor and well drained with a topsoil of clay, providing a good substrate for vines.
Rains are concentrated mainly in the winter season and the vineyards require drop irrigation for the rest of the year, using water from the Maipo River. The San Antonio Valley is seen as an up-and-coming wine region and the wine industry is expected to continue growing in the future.

Grape distribution by varietal

 Climate: Cool Mediterranean climate strongly influenced by the sea. 540 mm (21.2 in) of rain per year.
 Soils: clay and sandy soils.
 Primary grapes: Chardonnay, Pinot Noir, Sauvignon Blanc.
 

 
 Total hectares planted: 1728 ha (4270 acres).

See also
 Chilean wine
 Maipo River
 San Antonio, Chile

References

External links
  Official link
 

Provinces of Chile
Provinces of Valparaíso Region